The 1993 Atlantic 10 men's basketball tournament was played from March 7 to March 8, 1993, and March 11, 1993. The first two rounds were played at the Palestra in Philadelphia, Pennsylvania, while the final was played at the Mullins Center in Amherst, Massachusetts.  The winner was named champion of the Atlantic 10 Conference and received an automatic bid to the 1993 NCAA Men's Division I Basketball Tournament. The University of Massachusetts won the tournament. George Washington, Rhode Island, and Temple also received bids to the NCAA Tournament. Harper Williams of Massachusetts was named the tournament's Most Outstanding Player for the second consecutive year. Future NBA players Eddie Jones (Temple), Aaron McKie (Temple), and Lou Roe (Massachusetts) were among those also named to the All-Championship Team.

Bracket

* - Overtime

Atlantic 10 men's basketball tournament
Tournament
Atlantic 10 men's basketball tournament
Atlantic 10 men's basketball tournament
Atlantic 10 men's basketball tournament